Galina Baksheeva (12 July 1945 – 18 December 2019) was a Soviet tennis player from Ukraine.

Born in Kyiv, Baksheeva won back to back Wimbledon junior singles titles in 1961 and 1962. 

Baksheeva was a 13-time champion of the USSR during the 1960s, twice in singles and the rest in women's doubles or mixed doubles. 

At the Grand Slams, she made the fourth round of the 1967 Wimbledon Championships and 1968 French Open as well as reached the women's doubles quarterfinals at both events. 

In 1968, she played in three Federation Cup ties for the Soviet Union, including a quarterfinal against Great Britain.

See also
List of Soviet Federation Cup team representatives

References

External links
 
 
 

1945 births
2019 deaths
Soviet female tennis players
Ukrainian female tennis players
Wimbledon junior champions
Grand Slam (tennis) champions in girls' singles
Sportspeople from Kyiv